Essai d'ouverture is a 1988 French 15-minute-long film by Luc Moullet.
It's about one narrator and his attempts at opening a Coca-Cola bottle.

See also 
Luc Moullet
French new wave

External links 

1988 films
French comedy short films
1980s French-language films
1988 comedy films
1980s French films